Joseph Andoni Massad (born 1963) is a Jordanian academic specializing in Middle Eastern studies, who serves as Professor of Modern Arab Politics and Intellectual History in the Department of Middle Eastern, South Asian, and African Studies at Columbia University. His academic work has focused on Palestinian, Jordanian, and Israeli nationalism.

Massad was born in Jordan in 1963 and is of Palestinian Christian descent. He received his Ph.D. in political science from Columbia University in 1998. He is known for his book Desiring Arabs, about representations of sexual desire in the Arab world.

Biography 
In 1998, Massad received his doctorate in political science from Columbia University, and in the fall of 1999 he started teaching at the same institution. There, his views on the Israeli–Palestinian conflict and surrounding topics caused controversy. In 2009, he was awarded tenure at the university. The award was denounced by LionPAC, a pro-Israel advocacy group at Columbia.

Colonial Effects (2001) 
Massad's first book, Colonial Effects: The Making of National Identity in Jordan, was published in 2001 by Columbia University Press.  The book is based on Massad's PhD dissertation, which won the Middle East Studies Association Malcolm Kerr Dissertation Award in 1998.

Over the course of a detailed history of the Jordanian state, from its inception in 1921 to 2000, he argues that state institutions are central to the fashioning of national identity. Massad focuses on institutions of law, the military, and education as key components of nationalism, and elaborates on the production not only of national identity but also of national culture including food, clothes, sports, accents, songs, and television serials.

Colonial Effects was critically praised both by several senior academics in Middle East Studies, including Edward Said who described the book as "a work of genuine brilliance," and by scholars of nationalism such as Partha Chatterjee, Amr Sabet, and Stephen Howe, the last of whom called the book "among the most sophisticated and impressive products" of recent studies in the field. The book was extensively reviewed in academic journals and, according to Betty Anderson, one of the book's reviewers, it has become staple reading on syllabi of nationalism and Middle East politics university courses across the United States and Europe.

John Chalcraft of the University of Edinburgh described Massad's analysis of the impact of colonial subjection on modern Jordanian nationalism as "a major contribution to the literature on Jordanian nationalism, anticolonial nationalism, and the wider field of postcolonial studies;" he also criticizes the paucity of information Massad offers on how  "the mass of the population [who] barely get a mention in Massad's account," fared in this history: he finds that in Massad's account "there is an impression that one, white, male, colonial subject is privileged with potency, whereas the agency of others is effaced. For the colonizer, one theory of the subject, for the colonized, another."

The Persistence of the Palestinian Question (2006) 
The Persistence of the Palestinian Question: Essays on Zionism and the Palestinians, Massad's second book, was published in 2006 by Routledge.

The Persistence of the Palestinian Question analyzes Zionism and Palestinian nationalism from a variety of angles, including race, gender, culture, ethnicity, colonialism, antisemitism, and nationalist ideology.  Massad's analysis of the discourse on terrorism in the introduction deals with the dynamics of power relations between Zionism and the Palestinians and traces the history of Zionist and Israeli violence which the British called "terrorism" in Palestine before 1948 and after, while his title chapter on the persistence of the Palestinian question argues that the Palestinian and the Jewish questions are one and the same and that "both questions can only be resolved by the negation of anti-Semitism, which still plagues much of Europe and America and which mobilizes Zionism's own hatred of Jewish Jews and of the Palestinians."

The book has received praise from scholars Ilan Pappé and Ella Shohat as well as from Palestinian historian Walid Khalidi. Shohat praised the book as a "timely and engaging volume" that "makes an invaluable contribution to the ongoing debate over Zionism and Palestine." Pappé saw the book as a "courageous intellectual exercise" and as "a thought provoking book that forces us to reverse our conventional images and perceptions about Palestine's history and future."

Other scholars situated the book's contribution in relation to European history and to the work of Edward Said.  University of Pennsylvania political science professor Anne Norton wrote:

Massad's brilliant and scholarly work is profoundly illuminating not only for the history of Palestine and the discourses surrounding it, but for the history of Europe and the United States and, finally, as an account that raises compelling theoretical questions.

In his review in Nations and Nationalism, Israeli scholar Ephraim Nimni wrote:

like his intellectual mentor, Massad reminds us of a long and honourable tradition of Jewish Intellectuals who could only envisage the solution to the Jewish Question through universal emancipation. It seems that Massad, and the late Edward Said, are existential Diaspora Jews of the old kind ... The book is also fastidiously referenced, showing the erudition of the author and his command of the voluminous Israeli and Palestinian literature as well as the classics of Jewish history.

Desiring Arabs (2007) 
Massad's third book, Desiring Arabs, was published in 2007 by the University of Chicago Press. Desiring Arabs won Columbia University's 2008 Lionel Trilling Book Award, awarded by a jury of students on the grounds that it "offers a probing study of representations of Arab sexuality" and is "an important and eloquent work of scholarship that the committee feels will have a lasting impact on the field."

Desiring Arabs is an intellectual history of the Arab world and its Western representations in the nineteenth and twentieth centuries. The book makes contributions to a number of academic and theoretical fields. It extends Said's study of Orientalism by analyzing the latter's impact on Arab intellectual production; it links Orientalism to definitions and representations of sex and desire and in doing so provides a colonial archive to the sexual question that has hitherto been missing; it approaches the literary as the limits of imagining the future; and puts forth the question of translation as a central problem in Euro-American studies of the other.

Massad argues that "Western male white-dominated" gay activists, under the umbrella of what he terms the "Gay International," have engaged in a "missionary" effort to impose the binary categories of heterosexual/homosexual into cultures where no such subjectivities exist, and that these activists in fact ultimately replicate in these cultures the very structures they challenge in their own home countries. Massad writes that

The categories gay and lesbian are not universal at all and can only be universalized by the epistemic, ethical, and political violence unleashed on the rest of the world by the very international human rights advocates whose aim is to defend the very people their intervention is creating.

Reviews 
In her review of Desiring Arabs in the Arab Studies Journal, feminist scholar Marnia Lazreg, a professor of sociology at CUNY, wrote, "This truly monumental book is a corrective to Michel Foucault's History of Sexuality that inexplicably omitted the role played by the cultural effects of colonial systems on conceptions and constructions of sexuality ... [Desiring Arabs] is an epoch-making book". Khaled El-Rouayheb of Harvard University called the book, "A pioneering work on a very timely yet frustratingly neglected topic. ... I know of no other study that can even begin to compare with the detail and scope of [this] work."

Samia Mehrez, a professor of Arabic Literature at the American University in Cairo writes in the Journal of Gender Studies:

Desiring Arabs by Joseph Massad is an impressive project that ventures into uncharted territory and can be read as a complement to both Edward Said's Orientalism and Michel Foucault's work on sexuality. Like all of Massad's work, Desiring Arabs investigates the discursive and institutional continuum through which culture is 'invented' under both colonial rule through colonial practices that sought to reify racial and religious differences as well as through the cultural politics of the post-colonial nation state and its efforts to consolidate the nation, national identity, and national belonging.

Ferial Ghazoul in the Journal of Arabic Literature, writes:

While there has been a clear consensus on the book's significant scholarly contributions, some of the book's theses have been criticized by Rayyan Al-Shawaf, a freelance writer and reviewer living in Beirut, who concedes that Massad makes a few good points, but observes that "Massad's relativism – stemming from his accurate observation that 'homosexuality' is alien to Arab same-gender sexual traditions – is so extreme that he refuses to support a call for universal freedom of sexual identity." Al-Shawaf argues that,

In postulating the inevitability of (heterosexual) Arab violence wherever there is gay and lesbian assertiveness, Massad pre-emptively exonerates the perpetrators – whether individuals or the state – of any wrongdoing. However regrettable their behaviour, those Arabs who react violently to the gay rights campaign are not perceived by Massad as responsible for their actions, but as caught up in a broader struggle against 'imperialism', to which the gay rights movement is wedded.

Brian Whitaker criticized Massad for, in his view, repeating a common view of Arab nationalists and Islamists which essentially believes LGBT+ activism or identities are the result of a conspiracy by Western forces imposing themselves into Arab or Muslim societies. Massad ascribes this to Orientalist, colonial impulses, but Whitaker notes he cites no evidence of such motives, or a supposed excessive attention by what Massad calls the "Gay International" (LGBT+ rights groups) and human rights organizations on such societies. He is also critical of Massad seeming to present "the West" as a unified entity on such matters, ignoring opposition within Western countries toward LGBT+ acceptance or rights. Whitaker concludes Massad is blinded by his focus on these alleged forces which causes him to ascribe such pernicious influence as the cause of LGBT+ issues being raised in the Arab and Muslim world, rather than as the outgrowth of a wider social movement as a whole, following naturally from greater global communication. Massad is faulted as ignoring evidence of Arab and Muslim people adopting LGBT+ identities themselves, along with dismissing or downplaying repression they suffer from their governments.

Islam in Liberalism (2015) 
Islam in Liberalism is Joseph Massad's fourth book, published by University of Chicago Press in 2015. An article published by the Los Angeles Review of Books states that the thesis of the book is that "American and European missionaries of liberalism are trying to proselytize Muslims – and the entire world writ large – to the only sane system of values that exists on the planet: those of Western liberalism". The book deals with the "instrumentalization of Islam in the West" and responds to critiques of his earlier book Desiring Arabs.

Political views

On antisemitism 

Following arguments made by Edward Said in his 1978 book Orientalism, Massad asserts that 19th Century European antisemitic characterizations of Jews have transformed in the present era to target Arabs, while maintaining the same racialist characterizations, and thus, racism towards Arabs and Muslims today is a form of "Euro-American Christian anti-Semitism and ... Israeli Jewish anti-Semitism."  Massad bases this belief on an understanding of antisemitism as a specific historical phenomenon originating in Europe, rather than simply as hatred of Jews; he writes: "the claims made by many nowadays that any manifestation of hatred against Jews in any geographic location on Earth and in any historical period is 'anti-Semitism' smack of a gross misunderstanding of the European history of anti-Semitism".

On Israel and Zionism 

Massad believes that Israel is a racist Jewish state. He believes that Zionism is not only racist but antisemitic, and antisemitic not only towards Arab Palestinians, but also towards Jews. Massad writes that after Europeans invented the racialist conception of the "Semite," the Zionist movement "adopted wholesale anti-Semitic ideologies", and describes Zionism as an "anti-Semitic project of destroying Jewish cultures and languages in the diaspora", which has ultimately led to "the transformation of the Jew into the anti-Semite, and the Palestinian into the Jew."  Massad further accuses Zionists of unjustly "appropriating the fruit of the land that Palestinian peasants produced," and specifies the renaming of "Palestinian rural salad (now known in New York delis as Israeli salad)" as an example of Israeli racism.

Massad has spoken of genetic links being established between 19th-century European Jews and the ancient Israelite kingdom and the creation of a "semitic" identity for Jews at that time as actually a European, racist construction designed to portray European Jews as foreigners. Massad considers claims to Israel made by the Zionist movement based on that connection to be problematic. In a debate with Israeli historian Benny Morris, Massad said:

The claim made by the Zionists, and by Professor Morris, that late nineteenth-century European Jews are direct descendants of the ancient Palestinian Hebrews is what is preposterous here. This kind of anti-Semitic claim that European Jews were not European that was propagated by the racist and biological discourses on the nineteenth century, that they somehow descend from first-century Hebrews, despite the fact that they look like other Europeans, that they speak European languages, is what is absurd.

On the United States 

Massad was especially critical of "rabidly pro-Israeli American President Obama."

Massad views US culture as deeply infected with racism and misogyny, tying the Abner Louima case to torture in Abu Ghraib, and arguing that in Iraq, "American male sexual prowess, usually reserved for American women, [was] put to military use in imperial conquests", with "Iraqis ... posited.. as women and feminised men to be penetrated by the missiles and bombs ejected from American warplanes."  Massad concludes that "the content of the word 'freedom' that American politicians and propagandists want to impose on the rest of the world is nothing more and nothing less than America's violent domination, racism, torture, sexual humiliation, and the rest of it."

Massad has also criticized Arab intellectuals who "defend the racist and barbaric policies" of the United States, the International Monetary Fund and the World Bank in the Arab world.

On the Palestinian Authority

Massad  refers to the Palestinian Authority as the "Palestinian Collaborationist Authority," calls Mahmoud Abbas the "chief Palestinian collaborator," and accuses the PA of collaborating with Israel and the United States to crush Palestinian resistance.

Columbia Unbecoming 

Massad was the center of the Columbia Unbecoming controversy. In fall 2004, a pro-Israel campus organization produced a film, Columbia Unbecoming, interviewing students who claimed that he and other Columbia professors had intimidated or been unfair to them for their pro-Israel views. This led to the appointment of a committee by the university to investigate the complaints. In response to the film, United States Representative Anthony Weiner called on Columbia to fire Massad for what Weiner characterized as "anti-Semitic rantings."

The committee concluded its work in spring 2005, dismissed most of the allegations against Massad and the other professors, writing in its report that it had "no basis for believing that Professor Massad systematically suppressed dissenting views in his classroom" and stated that they "found no evidence of any statements made by the faculty that could reasonably be construed as anti-semitic." The committee found it "credible" that Massad was angered by a question in class from a student that he understood to be defending Israel's conduct toward Palestinians and that his response "exceeded commonly accepted bounds by conveying that her question merited harsh public criticism", but it also described an environment of incivility, with pro-Israel students disrupting lectures on Middle Eastern studies. Critics described the committee's findings as a whitewash.

Massad too criticized the findings, writing that it "suffer[ed] from major logical flaws, undefended conclusions, inconsistencies, and clear bias in favor of the witch-hunt that has targeted me for over three years". Massad continued to deny the one allegation that the report found "credible." Two students beside his accuser said that they witnessed the incident, but a teaching assistant said on WNYC in April 2005 that she was present and that Massad did not angrily criticize the student in question; after the release of the report, 20 students signed a letter stating that they were in class on the day of the alleged incident, and that the incident had never happened.

In an editorial discussing the case one week after the release of the Committee report, the New York Times noted that, while it believed Massad had been guilty of inappropriate behavior, it found the controversy overblown and professors such as Massad themselves victimized:

There is no evidence that anyone's grade suffered for challenging the pro-Palestinian views of any teacher or that any professors made anti-Semitic statements. The professors who were targeted have legitimate complaints themselves. Their classes were infiltrated by hecklers and surreptitious monitors, and they received hate mail and death threats.

Ankori threat of libel suit

A review by Massad of the book Palestinian Art, written by Israeli art history professor Gannit Ankori, was threatened  by a libel suit in Britain.  In the review, Massad accused Ankori of illegitimately appropriating the work of Kamal Boullata, a Palestinian artist and art historian, a charge which Ankori viewed as defamatory.

The review appeared in Art Journal, a publication of the College Art Association of America (CAA). To avoid a libel suit, the CAA agreed to issue an apology to Ankori, to pay her $75,000, and to send a letter to its institutional subscribers, stating that the Massad review "contained factual errors and certain unfounded assertions."  Massad acknowledged "minor errors", but not libel, and accused the CAA of cowardice. CAA executive director Linda Downs told The Forward that, while "there were mistakes" in the review, the journal agreed to pay only because it could not afford to fight out the case.

Books

References

External links

 Columbia profile
 Column archive at The Electronic Intifada

1963 births
Living people
American people of Palestinian descent
Columbia University alumni
Columbia University faculty
Middle Eastern studies in the United States
Palestinian academics
Palestinian Christians
Palestinianists